The women's 60 metres hurdles event  at the 1997 IAAF World Indoor Championships was held on March 8–9.

Medalists

Results

Heats
The first 2 of each heat (Q) and next 2 fastest (q) qualified for the semifinals.

Semifinals
First 3 of each semifinal (Q) qualified directly for the final.

Final

References

Hurdles
60 metres hurdles at the World Athletics Indoor Championships
1997 in women's athletics